The Stockhom Mean Machines are a Swedish American football team based in Stockholm. Founded 1982 the Mean Machines are the oldest American football team of the country and the most successful with a total of 12 national titles.

History 
The Mean Machines were founded in 1982 in Danderyd near Stockholm as Danderyd Mean Machines. They had the first loss in the national in 1985. Five years later the Danderyd Mean Machines won their first official national championship.

In 1995 the team changed names to Stockholm Mean Machines. From 1997 to 2000 the Mean Machines won four times the Superserien and became the most successful team of the country. Between 2002 and 2009 they won another six championships before they did not see the national final for a period of eight years.

The most recent seasons 2018 and 2019 the Mean Machines won two more championships each time with a perfect season.

Recent seasons

Source:

References

External links
Official website

American football teams in Sweden
Sport in Stockholm
American football teams established in 1982
1982 establishments in Sweden